Pervomaysky is a rural locality (a settlement) in Verkhnerechenskoye Rural Settlement, Nekhayevsky District, Volgograd Oblast, Russia. The population was 25 as of 2010.

Geography 
The village is located 10 km south-west of Verkhnerechensky.

References 

Rural localities in Nekhayevsky District